Pedrá is an album by musicians from different bands, signed as Extremoduro. It contains just one song. At first, it would be the first album of the "Pedrá" project. However, just one label, DRO, accepted to release, but the group name should be "Extremoduro". Its lyrics contains around 180 verses, of which four are in Catalan.

Track listing

Personnel
Pedrá
Roberto Iniesta "Robe" (from Extremoduro) - vocals, Guitars
José Luis Nieto "Selu" (from Reincidentes) - Sax
Joserra "Gary" Garitaonandia (from Quattro Clavos) - drums
Iñaki "Uoho" Antón (from Platero y Tú) - Guitars, Keys
Diego Garay 'Dieguillo' (from Quemando Ruedas)- Bass
Additional personnel
Fito Cabrales (from Platero y Tú) - Guitar
Ramone (from Capitán Kavernícola) - Vocals

Certifications

References

External links 
 Extremoduro official website (in Spanish)

1995 albums
Extremoduro albums
Spanish-language albums